Ethel Ward Petersen (6 August 1942 - June 2016) is a Danish former swimmer. She competed in the women's 100 metre backstroke at the 1960 Summer Olympics.

References

1942 births
Living people
Danish female swimmers
Olympic swimmers of Denmark
Swimmers at the 1960 Summer Olympics
Swimmers from Copenhagen